Zhang Han (張瀚, 1511–1593), courtesy name Ziwen (子文), art name Yuanzhou (元洲), was a leading scholar-official during the Ming dynasty (1368–1644) of China. Although eventually posted to serve in the capital at Beijing, Zhang was a native of the thriving commercial city of Hangzhou and a descendant of a wealthy family that ran a textile business. He was also a literary author, a painter, a follower of Chinese Buddhism, and an essayist while in retirement from office during his later years. According to the historian Timothy Brook, he was a "close observer of the changes of his age", in reference to China's intensified commercialism and consumption of commodities in the late Ming era and its effects upon Chinese culture.

Notes

Ming dynasty scholars
Ming dynasty Buddhists
Ming dynasty painters
Politicians from Hangzhou
Ming dynasty essayists
1511 births
1593 deaths
Writers from Hangzhou
Artists from Hangzhou
16th-century Chinese people
16th-century Chinese male writers
16th-century Chinese painters
Painters from Zhejiang
Viceroys of Liangguang
Buddhist artists